This current 2022–23 of the South African Premier Division is Mamelodi Sundowns' 27th consecutive season in the PSL League.

First Team Squad

Transfers

In

Out

Transfer Summery 

Spending

Winter:  ZAR 67' 800' 000

Summer: 

Total:  ZAR 67' 800' 000

Income

Winter:  ZAR 13' 000' 000

Summer: 

Total: 

Net expenditure

Winter:  ZAR 54' 800' 000

Summer: 

Total:  ZAR 54' 800' 0000

Competitions

Premier Soccer League

Results summary

Results by matchday

Matches

Nedbank Cup

MTN 8

Quarter final

Semi-finals

Champions League

Second round

Group stage

Carling Black Label Cup

Semi-final

Final

Squad Statistics

Appearances
Players with no appearances are not included on list.

Goals

Assists

Players

See also 
2022-23 South African Premier Division
2022 MTN 8
2022-23 CAF Champions League
2020-21 Mamelodi Sundowns FC season

References 

Mamelodi Sundowns F.C. seasons